Al-Awazem (also spelled Azmi and Awazem) Al Awazem is a large tribe in the Arabian Peninsula (Kuwait, Saudi Arabia, Bahrain, Qatar, United Arab Emirates, Jordan and Oman), Syria, Sudan and Egypt.  With the majority of its population residing in Kuwait and Saudi Arabia.

Origin

 Al Awazim is a tribe that Ancestors go back to Hawazin which is from Adnanites who are descendants of Ismail son of Ibrahim,  Al Awazim are a tribe that came and originated from Najd like most tribes they later on went to discover new lands after the betrayal of Sharif, Al Awazim stood up against Al Sharif for 2 years which back then was incredible, Al Awazim then moved on to have conquered land from the bay of Kuwait till the bay of Qatar and some of the Saudi Arabian land having one of the most significant and important land in the peninsula.

History 

 Al Awazem as a tribe their history goes way back known for being one of the bravest tribes in the area, they were one of the only tribes to have fought the Ottomans, Al Furs (Persians), Bani Rasheed they are related to many tribes around the peninsula, they once fought 7 tribes to protect the Emirate of Diriyah which is (Saudi Arabia) and the fight happened near the Emarit of Kuwait it goes without saying Without Al Awazim the Arabian peninsula would be in a very different state

 Al Awazem at that time had a strong alliance with Bani Khalid and Al Kathiri who in most of the wars they had with other tribes those three tribes had a great alliance among themselves

 With Al Awazem being the largest tribe in Kuwait and having most of the power in the National Parliament, Al Awazem were the first people to inhabit Kuwait build it and protect it most of the power Kuwait had came from Al Awazem, They assisted Kuwait with well known and some of the strongest commanders of the peninsula such as Mubarak al duraya who has been in many wars with Emirate of Diriyah against other Arab tribes ,Falah bn Jamea who is currently the tribe leader ,Khalf ibn athbiya who has been fighting the ottomans and 3 of his men achieved to kill 2 of the most feared and strongest commanders in the Ottoman Empire Hurshid Pasha and Mohammed Al-Afandi, they helped Kuwait because they wanted to maintain peace and stability in the region

 In Bahrain shaikh Musaed Al-Azmi who was the first ever Kuwaiti doctor who has sons that currently live in Bahrain for over 125 years

Arab groups
Tribes of Arabia
Tribes of Saudi Arabia
Tribes of the United Arab Emirates
Yemeni tribes
Tribes of Iraq
Tribes of Kuwait
Tribes of Syria
Tribes of Jordan